is a 1975 Japanese kaiju film directed by Ishirō Honda (his final film as a director), written by Yukiko Takayama, and produced by Tomoyuki Tanaka and Henry G. Saperstein, with special effects by Teruyoshi Nakano. Distributed by Toho and produced under their effects subsidiary Toho–Eizo, it is the 15th film in the Godzilla franchise, serving as a direct sequel to the 1974 film Godzilla vs. Mechagodzilla.

Terror of Mechagodzilla stars Katsuhiko Sasaki, Tomoko Ai, Akihiko Hirata, and Gorō Mutsumi, and features Toru Kawai, Kazunari Mori, and Tatsumi Nikamoto as the fictional monster characters Godzilla, Mechagodzilla 2, and Titanosaurus, respectively. The film was released theatrically in Japan on March 15, 1975, and in the UK in June 1976 under the title Monsters From an Unknown Planet. It received a limited release in the United States in 1978 by Bob Conn Enterprises under the title The Terror of Godzilla. The film remains the least financially successful entry in the Godzilla franchise to this day.

Plot
Following the events of Godzilla vs. Mechagodzilla, Interpol agents search for Mechagodzilla's remains at the bottom of the Okinawan Sea in the hopes of gathering information on the robot's builders, the alien Simeons. However, their submarine is attacked by a giant, aquatic dinosaur called Titanosaurus and the crew vanishes.

Interpol launches an investigation into the incident. With the help of marine biologist Akira Ichinose, they trace Titanosaurus to a reclusive, mad scientist named Shinzô Mafune, who wants to destroy mankind. While the group is visiting the scientist's old home, they meet Mafune's daughter, Katsura, who claims her father is dead and that she burned his notes about Titanosaurus at his request. Unbeknownst to Interpol, the living Mafune is visited by Tsuda, an aide to the Simeon leader Mugal, who is leading a project to rebuild Mechagodzilla. Mugal offers the Simeons' services to Mafune so that their respective monsters can wipe out mankind and allow them to rebuild the world for themselves.

Complicating matters, Ichinose falls in love with Katsura and unwittingly gives her Interpol's information on the Simeons, Mechagodzilla, and Titanosaurus. She is also revealed to be a cyborg, having undergone cybernetic surgery after she was nearly killed during one of her father's experiments as a child, and implanted with Mechagodzilla's control device. Additionally, an inpatient Mafune releases Titanosaurus on Yokosuka without the aliens' permission. While Interpol discovers the dinosaur is vulnerable to supersonic waves, Katsura destroys their supersonic wave oscillator. However, Godzilla arrives and easily defeats Titanosaurus, causing the latter to retreat.

When Ichinose visits Katsura, the Simeons capture him and force him to watch as they unleash Mechagodzilla 2 and Titanosaurus on Tokyo while Interpol repairs their wave oscillator and the Japanese armed forces struggle to fend off the monsters. Godzilla arrives, but is initially outmatched until Interpol distracts Titanosaurus with the repaired wave oscillator, allowing Godzilla to focus on Mechagodzilla 2. Interpol agents infiltrate the aliens' hideout, rescue Ichinose, and kill Mafune and many of the aliens. The remaining Simeons attempt to escape, but Godzilla shoots down their ships with its atomic breath. The wounded Katsura shoots herself to destroy Mechagodzilla 2's control device and dies in Ichinose's arms. With the robot non-functional, Godzilla tosses it into a chasm before blasting it with its atomic breath, causing it to explode and get buried. With help from Interpol, Godzilla then defeats Titanosaurus, who returns to the sea.

Cast

Production

Development

The original screenplay that Yukiko Takayama created after winning Toho's story contest for the next installment in the Godzilla series was picked by assistant producer Kenji Tokoro and was submitted for approval on July 1, 1974, less than four months after Godzilla vs. Mechagodzilla was released.

The original concept is similar to the finished version of Terror of Mechagodzilla, with many of the changes being budgetary in nature. The most obvious alteration is the removal of the two dinosaurs called the Titans, which merged to become Titanosaurus in the first draft. It was an interesting concept, although something that was also under-explained, considering the magnitude of such an occurrence of the creatures merging. Another noticeable change to the script is that of the final battle, which does not move to the countryside but instead would have reduced Tokyo to rubble during the ensuing conflict between the three monsters.

After her initial draft, Takayama submitted a revised version on October 14, 1974. This went through a third revision on December 4, and then yet another on December 28 of that same year before it was met with approval and filming began.

Jun Fukuda was initially offered the role of director for this instalment but refused having finally had enough of the series. Before Ishiro Honda agreed to return rumours persist Yoshimitsu Banno was also asked to direct due to Tomoyuki Tanaka being pleased with his work on Prophecies of Nostradamus.

Filming

This film is one of two Godzilla films with brief nudity (the other being 1994's Godzilla vs. SpaceGodzilla). The scene occurs when Katsura undergoes an operation to have Mechagodzilla 2's control device placed inside her body, at which point her breasts are exposed. While she was portrayed by a mannequin in the scene, the scene was cut when the film was released in the U.S., both from the theatrical and TV versions of the film, and was also missing from the UK theatrical version, though the scene was intact in the 1992 VHS release which used the Terror of Mechagodzilla title.

Director Ishiro Honda laments not being able to work with the story's writer, Yukiko Takayama, on other films, enjoying that a "woman's perspective was especially fresh" for the genre.

Kensho Yamashita was the chief assistant director on the project. He notes, though, that Honda never actually assigned any of the shooting to him, possibly because he was happy to be directing again after a long gap in his career and wanted to do the work himself.

English version

Toho titled its English version of the film Terror of Mechagodzilla and had it dubbed into English in Hong Kong. This “international version” has never seen wide release in the United States, but has been issued on VHS in the United Kingdom by PolyGram Video Ltd. and on DVD in Taiwan by Power Multimedia.

The film was given a North American theatrical release in March 1978 by independent distributor Bob Conn Enterprises under the title The Terror of Godzilla. Just as Cinema Shares had done with the previous three Godzilla movies, Bob Conn Enterprises chose to utilize the Toho-commissioned English dub instead of hiring a new crew to re-dub the film. The Terror of Godzilla was heavily edited to obtain a "G" rating from the MPAA. Several scenes with violent content were entirely removed, disrupting the flow of the narrative.

Henry G. Saperstein, who sold the theatrical rights to Bob Conn Enterprises, also released the film to television in late 1978, this time under Toho's international title, Terror of Mechagodzilla. Unlike The Terror of Godzilla, the television version remained mostly uncut, with only the shot of Katsura's naked breasts excised. Saperstein's editors also added a 10-minute prologue that served as a brief history of Godzilla, with footage from Saperstein's English versions of Invasion of Astro-Monster and All Monsters Attack (the latter of which utilized stock footage from both Ebirah, Horror of the Deep and Son of Godzilla).

In the mid-1980s, the U.S. television version, Terror of Mechagodzilla, was replaced by the theatrical edit, The Terror of Godzilla, on television and home video. For some reason, the title was also changed to Terror of Mechagodzilla. The 1994 Paramount release of Terror of Mechagodzilla listed a running time of 89 minutes on the slipcase, implying that this release would be the longer version first shown on American TV. The actual video cassette featured the edited theatrical version. In a 1995 interview with G-Fan magazine, Saperstein was surprised to hear about this mistake. In 1997 on Channel 4 in the U.K., three Godzilla movies were shown back to back late at night, starting with Godzilla vs. Megalon, Godzilla vs. Gigan and then Terror of Mechagodzilla; all were dubbed versions. This showing was uncut, including the Katsura nudity scene, but it did not have the Western-made prologue.

In the mid-2000s, the television version showed up again on Monsters HD, and in 2007, it made its home video debut as the U.S. version on the Classic Media DVD. Although the added prologue was originally framed for fullscreen television, it was cropped and shown in widescreen on the disc. The rest of the movie featured the audio from Saperstein's television version synced to video from the Japanese version.

The first article about the movie's storyline was published in Japanese Giants #4  in 1977, edited and published by Bradford G. Boyle, and was written by Richard H. Campbell, creator of The Godzilla Fan News Letter (a.k.a. "The Gang").

Box office
In Japan, the film sold 980,000 tickets. Despite earning positive reviews, it would be the least-attended Godzilla film in Japan and also one of only two Godzilla films to sell less than 1 million tickets. This was part of a decline in attendance for monster movies as a whole and Toho put the production of monster movies on hold. Toho had no intention of permanently ending the Godzilla series. Throughout the remainder of the 1970s, several new Godzilla stories were submitted by various writers and producers. None of these films, however, were ultimately made. It was not until 1984 and Godzilla'''s 30th anniversary that Toho would start production on a new Godzilla movie.

Home media
The film has been released several times on DVD in the United States. The first release, by Simitar Entertainment, was on May 6, 1998 in a fullscreen version under the title The Terror of Godzilla. The second release, by First Classic Media and distributed by Sony Music Entertainment, was on September 17, 2002. It was released both individually and as part of the Ultimate Godzilla DVD Collection box set, the latter being released on the same day.

It was then re-released by Second Classic Media, this time distributed by Genius Entertainment, on November 20, 2007 both individually and as part of the Godzilla Collection'' box set on April 29, 2008.

In 2019, both the Japanese version and the export English version were included in a Blu-ray box set released by the Criterion Collection, which included all 15 films from the franchise's Shōwa era.

References 
Notes

Bibliography

External links

 Godzilla on the web (Japan)
 
 
 
 

1975 films
1970s Japanese-language films
1970s science fiction films
Alien invasions in films
Films scored by Akira Ifukube
Films directed by Ishirō Honda
Films set in Okinawa Prefecture
Films set in Shizuoka Prefecture
Films set in Yokosuka
Giant monster films
Godzilla films
Japanese science fiction films
Japanese sequel films
Kaiju films
Mad scientist films
1970s monster movies
UPA films
Toho films
Mecha films
Apes in popular culture
Films about father–daughter relationships
1970s Japanese films